Johnson County is a county located in western portion of the U.S. state of Missouri. As of the 2010 census, the population was 52,595 with a 2018 estimate of 53,652. Its county seat is Warrensburg. The county was formed December 13, 1834 from Lafayette County and named for Vice President Richard Mentor Johnson.

Johnson County comprises the Warrensburg Micropolitan Statistical Area, which is also included in the Kansas City-Overland Park-Kansas City, MO-KS Combined Statistical Area.

Geography

Adjacent counties
Lafayette County (north)
Pettis County (east)
Henry County (south)
Cass County (west)
Jackson County (northwest)

Major highways
 U.S. Route 50
 Route 2
 Route 13
 Route 23
 Route 58
 Route 131

Demographics

As of the census of 2000, there were 48,258 people, 17,410 households, and 11,821 families residing in the county.  The population density was 58 people per square mile (22/km2).  There were 18,886 housing units at an average density of 23 per square mile (9/km2).  The racial makeup of the county was 90.12% White, 4.33% Black or African American, 0.65% Native American, 1.43% Asian, 0.13% Pacific Islander, 1.29% from other races, and 2.05% from two or more races. Approximately 2.92% of the population were Hispanic or Latino of any race.

There were 17,410 households, out of which 35.10% had children under the age of 18 living with them, 55.90% were married couples living together, 8.50% had a female householder with no husband present, and 32.10% were non-families. 22.70% of all households were made up of individuals, and 7.10% had someone living alone who was 65 years of age or older.  The average household size was 2.58 and the average family size was 3.07.

In the county, the population was spread out, with 25.10% under the age of 18, 20.20% from 18 to 24, 27.60% from 25 to 44, 17.80% from 45 to 64, and 9.30% who were 65 years of age or older.  The median age was 28 years. For every 100 females there were 101.90 males.  For every 100 females age 18 and over, there were 100.40 males.

The median income for a household in the county was $35,391, and the median income for a family was $43,050. Males had a median income of $28,901 versus $21,376 for females. The per capita income for the county was $16,037.  About 9.50% of families and 14.90% of the population were below the poverty line, including 15.20% of those under age 18 and 10.80% of those age 65 or over.

2020 Census

Education

Public schools
Chilhowee R-IV School District – Chilhowee
Chilhowee Elementary School (P–6)
Chilhowee High School (7–12)
Holden R-III School District – Holden
Holden Elementary School (P–5) 
Holden Intermediate School (3–5) 
Holden Middle School (6–8)
Holden High School (9–12)
Johnson County R-VII School District – Centerview
Crest Ridge Elementary School (P–5)
Crest Ridge Middle School (6–8)
Crest Ridge High School (9–12)
Kingsville R-I School District – Kingsville
Kingsville Elementary School (K–6)
Kingsville High School (7–12)
Knob Noster R-VIII School District – Knob Noster
Knob Noster Elementary School (P–5) 
Whiteman Air Force Base Elementary School (P–5) – Whiteman
Knob Noster Middle School (6–8)
Knob Noster High School (9–12)
Leeton R-X School District – Leeton
Leeton Elementary School (P–5)
Leeton Middle School (6–8)
Leeton High School (9–12)
Warrensburg R-VI School District – Warrensburg
Reese Early Childhood Education Center 
Maple Grove Elementary School (P–2) 
Ridge View Elementary School (P–2) 
Martin Warren Elementary School (3–5) 
Sterling Elementary School (3–5) 
Warrensburg Middle School (6–8) 
Warrensburg High School (9–12)
Warrensburg Area Career Center

Private schools
Johnson County Christian Academy – Centerview (K–9) – Nondenominational Christian

Post-secondary
University of Central Missouri – Warrensburg – A public, four-year university

Public libraries
Holden Public Library  
Trails Regional Library

Politics

Local
The Republican Party predominantly controls politics at the local level in Johnson County. Republicans hold all but two of the elected positions in the county.

State

Johnson County is divided into four legislative districts in the Missouri House of Representatives, all of which are held by Republicans.

District 51 — Dean Dohrman (R-La Monte). Consists of the eastern half of the city of Warrensburg.

District 52 — Nathan Beard (R-Sedalia). Consists of the community of Knob Noster, and Whiteman Air Force Base.

District 53 — Glen Kolkmeyer (R-Odessa). Consists of the northern section of the county.

District 54 — Dan Houx (R- Warrensburg). Consists of western half of the city of Warrensburg and the communities of Centerview, Chilhowee, Holden, Kingsville, La Tour, and Leeton.

All of Johnson County is a part of Missouri's 21st District in the Missouri Senate and is currently represented by Denny Hoskins (R-Warrensburg).

Federal

All of Johnson County is included in Missouri's 4th Congressional District and is currently represented by Vicky Hartzler (R-Harrisonville) in the U.S. House of Representatives.

Political culture
Johnson is a solidly Republican county. The last Democrat to carry Johnson County was Bill Clinton in 1992.

Communities

Cities
Chilhowee
Kingsville
Knob Noster
Leeton
Warrensburg (county seat)

Villages
Centerview
Holden

Census-designated places
La Tour
Whiteman AFB

Other unincorporated places

 Bowen
 Bowmansville
 Burtville
 Columbus
 Cornelia
 Denton
 Dunksburg
 Elm
 Fayetteville
 Fulkerson
 Greendoor
 Henrietta
 Hoffman
 Magnolia
 Medford
 Montserrat
 Mount Olive
 Owsley
 Pittsville
 Post Oak
 Quick City
 Robbins
 Rose Hill
 Sutherland
 Valley City

See also
 List of counties in Missouri
 Missouri census statistical areas
National Register of Historic Places listings in Johnson County, Missouri

References

Further reading
 Cockrell, Ewing. History of Johnson County, Missouri (1918) online

External links
 Digitized 1930 Plat Book of Johnson County  from University of Missouri Division of Special Collections, Archives, and Rare Books

 
1834 establishments in Missouri
Populated places established in 1834